The genus Pseudantechinus are members of the order Dasyuromorphia. They are often called false antechinuses, although this genus includes the sandstone dibbler, which was previously assigned to a different genus.

The species of this genus are as follows:
 Sandstone dibbler, Pseudantechinus bilarni
 Fat-tailed false antechinus, Pseudantechinus macdonnellensis
 Alexandria false antechinus, Pseudantechinus mimulus
 Ningbing false antechinus, Pseudantechinus ningbing
 Rory Cooper's false antechinus, Pseudantechinus roryi
 Woolley's false antechinus, Pseudantechinus woolleyae

Pseudantechinus macdonellensis

Taxonomy
Scientific Name: Pseudantechinus macdonellensis
Common Name: English-Fat-tailed-Antechinus, Fat-tailed Pseudantechinus

Habitat and geographic range
The P. macdonellensis is commonly found in the rocky environments of Central Australia.

General facts
A P. macdonellensis is a medium-sized dasyurid marsupial that ranges from 18-33 grams, and has a life span of about seven years. It is presumed to have a large population, and generally lives within the confines of protected areas. Therefore, it is unlikely to decline at the rate needed to be listed as an endangered species.

Diet
The P. macdonellensis  is generally an insectivore whose diet consists of beetles, grasshoppers, and termites. A characteristic specific to this kind of species is its ability to store fat in its tail when food is plentiful.

Torpor
In the winter, most free ranging P. macdonellensis go into a state of torpor after midnight within the confines of rock crevices, and stay there until day breaks. In the morning, while they are still torpid, they move from the rock-crevices to basking sites exposed to the sun. Subsequently, this type of basking continues for the rest of the day. It appears that daily torpor is done in order to reduce the amount of daily metabolic expenditure by about 30%, and allows the species to live and reproduce in a challenging environment. It has also been observed that the species goes into a state of torpor at air temperatures ranging from -1 °C to 36 °C, and often occurs under circumstances in which the species finds itself under acute energetic stress.

Gestation
Males and females of the subdivision P. macdonellensis reach sexual maturity at about 350 days of age. A single gestation period takes about 43 days in the females, and produces a single litter of about six. The interval in between gestation periods is about 365 days.

Pseudantechinus mimulus

Taxonomy
Scientific Name: Pseudantechinus mimulus
Common Name: Alexandria False Antechinus, Carpentaria Pseudantechinus

Habitat and geographic range
The P. mimulus is endemic to Australia. More specifically, they are restricted to Sir Edward Pellew Group (Northern Territory), Centre and Southwest Islands, and two locations near Queensland. In the 1988 census of the territories, the species was found in the Centre and South West Islands, but in the 2003 census it was not located. It is believed that the P. mimulus still resides within that area, but is yet to be confirmed. In addition, the habitat in which the species resides in is a rocky one with scattered trees and wood.

General
The P. mimulus is classified as an endangered species. Its endangerment is due to the decline in habitat quality and extent as a result of fire, introduced predators, and mining.

Diet
While a lot of details about the species diet is unknown, it is believed that they eat mostly invertebrates as well as some small vertebrates.

References

 

Dasyuromorphs